Inanna Sarkis is a Canadian actress of Bulgarian and Assyrian descent.

Early life and career 
Sarkis was born in Hamilton, Ontario, the daughter of an Assyrian father who was a dentist and a Bulgarian mother who used to be a surgeon in Bulgaria. Both immigrated to Canada to start a new life for their children and worked cleaning dishes in banquet halls until they started their own family company. 

Sarkis struck a deal with Sprint to participate in a campaign. Sarkis teamed up with the WWE to create a character named "Miss North" and visited the WWE Performance Center  for where she filmed. She also starred in a digital campaign to promote 20th Century Fox’s action spy comedy Kingsman: The Golden Circle in November.

Personal life 
In September 2020, Sarkis gave birth to a daughter, her first child with her boyfriend of three years Matthew Noszka.

Filmography

Discography

Singles

References

External links 
 
 

Canadian film actresses
Canadian YouTubers
Living people
Canadian people of Assyrian descent
Canadian people of Bulgarian descent
Canadian people of Syrian descent
People from Hamilton, Ontario
Year of birth missing (living people)